A Rivlin–Ericksen temporal evolution of the strain rate tensor such that the derivative translates and rotates with the flow field.  The first-order Rivlin–Ericksen is given by

where
 is the fluid's velocity and
 is -th order Rivlin–Ericksen tensor.
Higher-order tensor may be found iteratively by the expression

 

The derivative chosen for this expression depends on convention.  The upper-convected time derivative, lower-convected time derivative, and Jaumann derivative are often used.

References
 

Multivariable calculus
Fluid dynamics
Non-Newtonian fluids